John Andrew was the member of Parliament for Cricklade in England for various parliaments between 1378 and 1388.

References 

Year of birth missing
English MPs 1378
English MPs January 1380
English MPs 1381
English MPs May 1382
English MPs February 1383
English MPs April 1384
English MPs 1385
English MPs 1386
English MPs February 1388
Members of the Parliament of England (pre-1707) for Cricklade
Year of death missing